General elections were held in Namibia on 28 November 2014, although early voting took place in foreign polling stations and for seagoing personnel on 14 November. The elections were the first on the African continent to use electronic voting. 

A total of nine candidates ran for the presidency, whilst 16 political parties contested the National Assembly elections. Hage Geingob of the ruling SWAPO party, won the presidential elections with 87% of the vote.  SWAPO also won the National Assembly elections, taking 80% of the vote.

Presidential election

Candidates
Originally, incumbent President Pohamba predicted that twenty-two candidates would contest the presidential election.  In the end, only nine political parties submitted presidential candidates.

SWAPO
In 2008, the SWAPO Central Committee produced a policy document stating that the party's candidate would be chosen for each election among the top four Committee members. In March 2011 SWAPO declared that whoever was the party's vice-president following the forthcoming party elections would also be the party's candidate in 2014 for president. Some high-level party members, particularly Kazenambo Kazenambo, advocated that SWAPO choose a non-Ovambo candidate, as the first two Presidents, Sam Nujoma and Pohamba, were from the Ovambo people. Others advocated the selection of a woman. SWAPO indicated that the candidate would be chosen democratically in the 2012 party election.

SWAPO was viewed as the clear favorite going into the election.

Parliamentary election
SWAPO announced a gender equality system where women would fill half of their seats in parliament. The party also embraced what it called a "zebra system", whereby if a minister was a woman, the deputy minister would be a man, and vice versa. Because there were more male SWAPO MPs than female MPs, SWAPO put forward plans to expand parliament to remove the risk of male MPs losing their seats as a result of this gender policy. These changes to the constitution were approved a month prior to the election against the votes of opposition parties, as SWAPO had a two-thirds majority in Parliament. Since then, instead of 78 seats (72 elected, 6 appointed) there 104 seats in the National Assembly (96 elected, 8 appointed).

Results

President

National Assembly

References

External links

Presidential elections in Namibia
Election, general
Namibia
Elections in Namibia
National Assembly (Namibia)
November 2014 events in Africa